The 1935 Tour of Flanders was held on April 14, 1935.

General classification

Final general classification

References
Résultats sur siteducyclisme.net
Résultats sur cyclebase.nl

External links
 

Tour of Flanders
1935 in road cycling
1935 in Belgian sport